This is a list of postcode districts in the United Kingdom and Crown Dependencies. A group of postcode districts with the same alphabetical prefix is called a postcode area. All, or part, of one or more postcode districts are grouped into post towns.

Until 1996, Royal Mail required counties to be included in addresses, except for 110 of the larger post towns. For these "special post towns", the former postal county is shown in brackets below. Since 1996, counties are not required for any address.

Postcode district codes are also known as "outward codes".

List

Notes
 Non-geographic postcode district
 Postcode district shared between post towns
 Not part of the United Kingdom and separate postal authorities

See also
List of postcode areas in the United Kingdom

References

External links
 
  (Lists all "in use non-geographic sectors" and "current PO Box sectors".)
 
 
 

Districts
Postcode districts in the United Kingdom
United Kingdom